Rupert Andrew Woodward Goodman, FRGS DL (born 17 April 1963) is a British publisher, international affairs expert and entrepreneur.

Life and career 

Goodman was born in Kidderminster. He was educated at Eton College and Trinity College, Cambridge where he represented the university in the Varsity Athletics Match as a hurdler. He was also Secretary of the Pitt Club. After graduating from Cambridge, Goodman worked at J. Walter Thompson in London. In 1984 he founded FIRST, a multi-disciplinary international affairs organisation, he is currently chairman of FIRST. FIRST received the Queen's Award for Enterprise in 2010 and 2013, for excellence in international markets.

In 2000 he founded the Responsible Capitalism Initiative and Annual Award to honour business leaders who have excelled in both commercial success and social responsibility.

He is a founding trustee and chairman of the British-Kazakh Society, and a founding director of Equilibrium. He is the chairman of World Petroleum, Global Energy and World Energy Insight. He was elected a founding director of NewWaveSolutions, a subsidiary of DEME, in 2016 and became Chairman of the Thai-United Kingdom Business Council in 2019.

He was a Trustee of the National Botanic Garden of Wales between 2005-2008.

In 2012 Goodman was appointed a Deputy Lieutenant of Greater London. He is also the recipient of a London Metropolitan Police Commissioner's Commendation and is a Freeman of the City of London.

Goodman is a Vice President of Flora and Fauna International and a member of the development board of Artes Mundi.

Goodman was appointed Deputy Chairman and a Trustee of Prince's Trust International in 2016.

Bibliography 

Goodman has co-edited and written a number of books, including:

 The Critical Decade (2003)
 The 21st Century: A view from the South (2005)
 Responsible Capitalism I (2009)
 Britain's Foreign Policy in a Networked World (2011)
 Nursultan Nazarbayev, Leadership Perspectives (2015)
 South to the Great Steppe (2015)
 Responsible Capitalism II (2017)
 Bahrain: Celebrating 200 Years Together (2017)
 Britain and Bahrain: A Celebration of Friendship (2018)
 Two Decades of Leadership: His Majesty King Hamad bin Isa Al Khalifa (2019)
 Father of the Nation; First President Nursultan Nazarbayev (2020)

References

External links 

British publishers (people)
1963 births
Living people
People educated at Eton College
Alumni of Trinity College, Cambridge
Deputy Lieutenants of Greater London
Fellows of the Royal Geographical Society